Tarkhan is an ancient Egyptian necropolis, located around 50 km south of Cairo on the west bank of the Nile.
The cemetery was excavated in two seasons by Flinders Petrie. Tombs of almost all periods were found, but most importantly many belonging to the time of Egyptian state formation, the Early Dynastic period around 3100 BC. Petrie found more than 2,000 tombs, most of them simple holes in the ground belonging to common people. However, there were also several mastabas of the First Dynasty, decorated with a palace facade.

The most important finds include a tomb with many seal impressions belonging to king Narmer and Tarkhan dress,one of the oldest dresses found in Egypt. The cemeteries of the later periods are called Kafr Ammar, although lying side by side with the earlier tombs. From a Roman period tomb came a Fayum mummy portrait.

Tomb 1060
Tomb 1060 is the oldest and largest mastaba at Tarkhan. It was divided into several rooms, most likely used for storing burial goods, although little survived. In the middle was the underground burial chamber with four small side chambers not connected by doorways, but there were doors incised on the walls acting as symbolic chambers. The niches were painted red; only one niche, with a wooden floor, was unpainted. This might indicate a cult place for the deceased. Around the mastaba there was a wall. The name of the owner is unknown.

Gallery

See also
 List of ancient Egyptian sites, including sites of temples

Bibliography
Wolfram Grajetzki: "The architecture and the signification of the Tarkhan mastabas" In: Archeo-Nil 18 (2008), p. 103-112
W. Grajetzki, Tarkhan, In: J. Picton, I. Pridden (editors): Unseen Images, Archive Photographs in the Petrie Museum, Volume I: Gurob, Sedment and Tarkhan, London 2008, p. 185-237 
W M. Flinders Petrie, G.A. Wainwright, B.A., A.H. Gardiner, D. Litt.: Tarkhan I and Memphis V, London 1913 
W.M. Flinders Petrie: Tarkhan II, London 1914 
W.M. Flinders Petrie: Heliopolis, Kafr Ammar and Shurafa, London 1915

Archaeological sites in Egypt